Biblioteksentralen AL is a library center for public libraries in Norway, with offices in Oslo. It is the primary supplier of books, equipment and services to these libraries.

Libraries make use of Biblioteksentralen's centralized library catalog system, BIBBI. It contains 170,000 bibliographic records, with 11,000 records added each year. A simplified version of the MARC21/NORMARC format is used, called BSMARC.

Biblioteksentralen is cooperatively owned (the "AL" suffix to the name means "andelslag" or cooperatively held corporation) by 425 municipalities, 14 counties, the Norwegian Association of Local and Regional Authorities, and the Norwegian Library Association. It was established in this form in February 1952 after a government resolution in the previous year, but its predecessor Folkeboksamlingenes Ekspedisjon had been around since 1902.

See also 
 National Library of Norway
 Bibsys

References

External links 
 
 BIBBI

Cooperatives in Norway
Business services companies of Norway
Library centers
Companies based in Oslo
Business services companies established in 1952
Bibliographic database providers
Bibliographic databases and indexes
1952 establishments in Norway
Government-owned companies of Norway